Nebraska Highway 89 is a highway in southern Nebraska.  Its western terminus is at U.S. Highway 83 west of Danbury.  Its eastern terminus is at an intersection with U.S. Highway 183 south of Alma.

Route description
Nebraska Highway 89 begins at US 83 west of Danbury, and heads in a northeasterly direction into farmland.  It passes through the unincorporated area of Marion, as well as Danbury and Lebanon.  Further ahead, the route passes by NE 47 and continues eastward into Wilsonville.  The highway continues onward, turning again to the northeast as it passes through Hendley before heading directly eastward again.  West of Beaver City, it intersects with US 283 before actually passing through Beaver City.  It then meets with NE 46 before heading through Stamford to the east.  The route passes through the Flynn Junction area before entering the city of Orleans.  At this point, it meets US 136 and runs concurrently with it for half a mile before turning to the south.  It heads south and to the east before terminating at US 183 south of Alma.

Major intersections

References

External links

Nebraska Roads: NE 81-100

089
Transportation in Red Willow County, Nebraska
Transportation in Furnas County, Nebraska